Lone Oak Branch is a stream in Bates County in the U.S. state of Missouri. It is a tributary to Double Branch.

Lone Oak Branch was named for an individual oak tree which tradition states was once used as a hanging tree.

See also
List of rivers of Missouri

References

Rivers of Bates County, Missouri
Rivers of Missouri